"Queen of Jordan" is the seventeenth  episode of the fifth season of the American television comedy series 30 Rock, and the 97th overall episode of the series. It was written by Tracey Wigfield and directed by Ken Whittingham. The episode originally aired on NBC in the United States on March 17, 2011. The episode follows a reality show format and often parallels the events of The Real Housewives franchise. Guest stars in this episode include Sherri Shepherd, Susan Sarandon and Tituss Burgess.

This episode aired as an episode of Queen of Jordan, a fictional reality series that started sometime during the events of "Mrs. Donaghy". In this episode, Jack Donaghy (Alec Baldwin) tasks Liz with convincing Angie to get Tracy to return from Africa. Meanwhile, Frank is found by his lost love. Throughout the episode, Jack gets into embarrassing situations and Jenna tries to be the focus of the reality show's cameras.

This episode of 30 Rock received generally positive reviews from television critics. According to Nielsen Media Research, "Queen of Jordan" was watched by  4.192 million households during its original broadcast, and received a 1.7 rating/5 share among viewers in the 18–49 demographic.

Plot

The episode begins with Angie Jordan (guest star Sherri Shepherd) headed for a meeting with Jack Donaghy (Alec Baldwin) to discuss how her new single "My Single Is Dropping" is dropping. Jack offers to throw a release party on the set of TGS, but during the conversation, he trips, which gets caught by the cameras. Liz Lemon (Tina Fey), head writer of TGS, begs Angie to get Tracy Jordan (Tracy Morgan) to come back from Africa, but Angie doesn't want to.

Liz is worried, but Jack tells Liz to continue trying to convince Angie to get Tracy back from Africa. Liz uses several attempts, at first impersonating Tracy (to which Angie says, "Don't do impressions of other races"). Liz then shows her their wedding video, saying that she "mixed up" the DVD of that with the DVD of the backup dancers' auditions for the release party of the song (which is revealed to be 15 seconds long). This also fails. When Liz sees that Tracy came to their wedding with handcuffs and police behind him, this proves how "exhausting" Tracy is to Angie. Liz's third attempt, sending an e-mail from Angie's computer to Tracy, is the last straw for Angie. She then proceeds to pull out Liz's hair (thinking that it was a weave) and explains that she is contractually obliged to "pull out some bitches' weaves eight more times this season."

Throughout the episode, Jenna Maroney (Jane Krakowski) tries to get more screen time and promote her website Jennas-Side.com (which, when said out loud, sounds like "genocide") with the reality show cameras by throwing wine at several people. While drunk, Portia (Moya Angela), talks to Jenna about her alcoholism. Jenna pretends to not like the planned intervention, while actually loving it because it will get her more screen time. However, her plan backfires in the end when Pete, who led the intervention, sends Jenna to rehab. Jenna ends up knocking the driver unconscious and sneaks off to Angie's single release party.

Meanwhile, Jack Donaghy is being portrayed as a clumsy, gay flatulent when he is talking to Grizz and Dot Com about his college days. He goes on to say that he "went both ways" (i.e., played on both offense and defense in football) and was "on the DL" (i.e., the baseball disabled list). It is then presumed that he is gay because of his misconstrued statements. Angie's gay friend D'Fwan (Tituss Burgess) talks to him about this. Jack, in a talking head interview, says that he is not gay, but further embarrasses himself when a fart sound is heard as he stands up from the chair.

Meanwhile, news of Lynn Onkman's (guest star Susan Sarandon) release from jail reveals to the TGS office that one of the writers, Frank Rossitano (Judah Friedlander), was Lynn's lover when he was 14. This led to Lynn Onkman's arrest and status as a registered sex offender. Lynn meets Frank at the TGS office. Inspired by their love, Randi (Paula Leggett Chase) sets them up on a date at her pole-dancing studio and watches them while she dances on a pole. Frank and Lynn have an argument because she talks about how he has remained "stuck" as a boy who loves comic books and action figures. Frank storms out, but the next day, he brings all his toys to her workplace in a fast food restaurant and puts them in a deep fryer to prove that he is ready to become a man she loves. Lynn is fired, but Frank and Lynn rekindle their relationship.

At the release party, Liz finally confronts Angie about getting Tracy back and tells her that Tracy is a part of their family. She goes on to say her family is as "thick as thieves" before flipping a table, likely referencing a phrase used by Caroline Manzo and the infamous table flip by Teresa Giudice, both stars of the Real Housewives of New Jersey. Angie cries, but when Liz apologizes, she says that it is because of seeing how Frank and Lynn love each other. She goes on to say that she misses her "weird love" with Tracy. Angie confesses that she has been trying to get Tracy to come back since he left, but because he doesn't want to go back, she pretends to be happy about it.

Reception
According to the Nielsen Media Research, this episode of 30 Rock was watched by 4.192 million households in its original American broadcast. It earned a 1.7 rating/5 share in the 18–49 demographic. This means that it was seen by 1.7 percent of all 18- to 49-year-olds, and 5 percent of all 18- to 49-year-olds watching television at the time of the broadcast. The figure was a decrease from the previous episode, TGS Hates Women, which was seen by 4.501 million households.

Alan Sepinwall of HitFix was largely positive toward the episode, describing it as "a pretty thorough send-up of the cliches of the Real Housewives franchise" and opining that "Jack sinking deeper and deeper into the show's caricatured conception of him was hilarious". Sepinwall also noted that "Tracy Morgan's medical leave [had] forced the show to vamp a bit, and this was a particularly creative bit of vamping with some fine gags", however he commented that he looked forward to the show returning to normal the following week.

The A.V. Club critic Emily VanDerWerff commented on the improved quality that the fifth season of 30 Rock had demonstrated, attributing it to the show "rediscovering its sense of playfulness". She praised the primary plot, commenting that "the Liz storyline was unexpectedly moving, as Liz’s farcical attempts to get Tracy to come back [...] led to the revelation that Angie has been trying to get Tracy to come back to no avail". However, she also noted that the episode's format crowded out a number of storylines, including the one featuring Susan Sarandon.

Dan Forcella of TV Fanatic was also positive toward the episode, praising the character of Angie and saying that "everything about [the] spoof worked", whilst Ian McDonald of TVOverMind said that the humour in the episode "reads like a checklist for 'Housewife' reality shows to adhere to" and concluded that "including the minor hiccups, "Queen of Jordan" was the best episode of the season, if not the most memorable".

References

External links
 

2011 American television episodes
30 Rock (season 5) episodes
Fictional television shows
Reality television series parodies